The Canton of Châteaumeillant is a canton situated in the Cher département and in the Centre-Val de Loire region of France.

Geography 
A farming area in the southern part of the arrondissement of Saint-Amand-Montrond centred on the town of Châteaumeillant.

Composition 
At the French canton reorganisation which came into effect in March 2015, the canton was expanded from 11 to 38 communes:
 
Ainay-le-Vieil
Arcomps
Ardenais
Beddes
La Celle-Condé
La Celette
Châteaumeillant
Le Châtelet
Chezal-Benoît
Culan
Épineuil-le-Fleuriel
Faverdines
Ids-Saint-Roch
Ineuil
Lignières
Loye-sur-Arnon
Maisonnais
Montlouis
Morlac
La Perche
Préveranges
Reigny
Rezay
Saint-Baudel
Saint-Christophe-le-Chaudry
Saint-Georges-de-Poisieux
Saint-Hilaire-en-Lignières
Saint-Jeanvrin
Saint-Maur
Saint-Pierre-les-Bois
Saint-Priest-la-Marche
Saint-Saturnin
Saint-Vitte
Saulzais-le-Potier
Sidiailles 
Touchay
Vesdun
Villecelin

Population

See also 
 Arrondissements of the Cher department
 Cantons of the Cher department
 Communes of the Cher department

References

Chateaumeillant